The 1984 Avon Cup was a women's tennis tournament played on outdoor clay courts in Marco Island, Florida in the United States that was part of the 1983–84 Virginia Slims World Championship Series. The tournament was held from January 28 through February 3, 1985. Fifth-seeded Bonnie Gadusek won the singles title.

Finals

Singles
 Bonnie Gadusek defeated  Kathleen Horvath 3–6, 6–0, 6–4
It was Gadusek's 1st title of the year and the 2nd of her career.

Doubles
 Hana Mandlíková /  Helena Suková defeated  Anne Hobbs /  Andrea Jaeger 3–6, 6–2, 6–2
It was Mandlíková's 3rd title of the year and the 23rd of her career. It was Suková's 1st title of the year and the 2nd of her career.

References

External links
 ITF tournament edition details

Avon Cup
Avon Cup
1984 in Florida